Yossi  (original Hebrew title: הסיפור של יוסי; English transliteration: Ha-Sippur Shel Yossi) is a 2012 drama Israeli film directed by Eytan Fox and written by Itay Segal. It stars Ohad Knoller, Oz Zehavi and Lior Ashkenazi.

Yossi, Fox's fifth feature film, is a sequel to the director's breakthrough work Yossi & Jagger (2002). The plot takes place a decade after the events in that previous film. It follows the title character, a closeted gay cardiologist who struggles to find meaning in his life while overcoming the loss of his lover and reconciling his past with his future. Eytan Fox had previously directed Knoller in The Bubble; Ashkenazi in Walk on Water and Orly Silbersatz in Shirat Ha'Sirena.

Plot
Yossi, a 34-year-old closeted gay man, works as a cardiologist in a hospital in Tel Aviv. He has never completely recovered from the death of the love of his life, ten years before. Unhappy in his personal life, Yossi has thrown himself into his work. When not on call, the physician finds comfort in greasy take-out noodles and soft core gay porn.

One patient, who shows up for a check-up at the hospital, whom Yossi recognises as Varda Amichai, the mother of Jagger, his dead lover. Insisting on treating her, she asks him if they had met before, but Yossi denies it. During the test he tries to get information from her. Varda claims to have no children. At the end of the test he meets her at the exit from the hospital, apparently by accident, and offers her a ride home. During the trip, Varda opens up to him and tells him that in fact she had a son who was killed in Lebanon, and shows him his picture.

Yossi is faced with the demons of loneliness and desperation, compounded by his age and being overweight. He tries online dating but he arranges a meeting using an old and misrepresentative photo. His date, a narcissistic bar owner, is clearly disgusted that the doctor does not match his much slimmer profile.

A mistake in a botched procedure, that nearly costs a patient his life, makes Yossi's supervisor gently upbraid him for not taking a vacation. At work, there are rumors that the quiet and withdrawn Yossi might be gay. Nevertheless, he has attracted the interest of Nina, a nurse infatuated with him. When she kisses him while he is asleep, Yossi wakes up and rebuffs her.

Unable to address his sexuality with his colleagues, Yossi has to face a compromising night out with Moti, a fellow doctor who self-medicates with dope. Recently divorced, Moti is eager to have a good time and takes Yossi along with him to the straight bar scene, inviting him for drinks, drugs and easy women. At a bar, Moti, uninvited, follows Yossi to the bathroom to get him to have sex with a girl, but Yossi flees the scene. Crying, and mourning his dead lover, Yossi spends the night in his car in front of Varda's house. The next morning, he is invited in by Jagger's father. Unburdening his heart, Yossi tells them about his two-year love affair with their son, and the circumstances in which he was killed. The revelations do not go down well with Varda, who asks him to leave, but Jagger's father invites Yossi to see their son's bedroom.

Yossi decides to leave Tel Aviv for an impromptu vacation in the south, intending to go to the Sinai coast. On his way, he meets four young soldiers in a rest stop. They've missed their bus and Yossi gives them a ride to their hotel in Eilat. The soldiers include Yossi in their friendly insults, making fun of the music he has. Dropping them off at a resort, Yossi initially resists their invitation to join them, but changes his mind at the Egyptian border, turning back to take a room at the same hotel. One of the soldiers, Tom, who is openly gay, and is teased about it by his friends, takes it upon himself to befriend Yossi. He gives Yossi a gift certificate for a massage, which Yossi accepts, but doesn't use; he remains shy and circumspect.

At night, during a show by singer-songwriter Keren Ann, Yossi is joined by Tom. They continue to spend time together on a promenade, talking about Yossi's time in the military, and Tom's coming out to his fellow soldiers, but not to his family. Tom goes skinny dipping in the ocean, but steps on a sea urchin. Yossi treats Tom's wound in his hotel room, while Tom flirts with him, but Yossi does not respond. Tom leaves the room, but comes back shortly after and asks Yossi for a kiss. They kiss and go to bed, where Yossi turns off the light, but Tom turns it back on. Shy and overweight, Yossi is embarrassed to be seen naked, but they embrace.  After driving down together to Sinai, as they sit on the beach, Tom declares that he would like to stay there, and Yossi surprises him by stating that he'd also like to stay there "forever".

Cast
Ohad Knoller as Yossi Gutmann
Oz Zehavi as Tom	
Orly Silbersatz as Varda Amichai 	
Lior Ashkenazi as Moti Hoffman 	
Ola Schur Selektar as Nina
Meir Golan as Nimrod
Shlomi Ben Attar as Fefer
Amir Jerassi as Benda 	
Raffi Tavor as Mr. Amichai	
Shlomo Sadan as Professor Neuman
Bobbi Jene Smith as Rachelle

Reception
Rotten Tomatoes reported that 87% of 31 sampled critics gave the film positive reviews. Metacritic, which assigns a weighted mean rating out of 100 to reviews from film critics, has a rating score of 65 based on 15 reviews.

Ella Taylor from NPR called the film “Funny, exuberant and shamelessly seductive, Yossi is an unabashedly populist entertainment with a spirit conciliatory enough to melt the heart of any naysayer." Many reviewers single out Ohad Knoller for praise with Frank Scheck from The Hollywood Reporter commenting that he manages" to make his character compelling even at his most withdrawn and sullen. The extra weight that the actor has packed on gives him an air of vulnerability that makes his character's ultimate emergence from his seemingly impenetrable emotional shell all the more moving".

Robert Abele in Los Angeles Times called Yossi “effortlessly affecting, graced with deadpan humor and a knowingness about lonely lives.“ In his review for Wall Street Journal, Joe Morgenstern described the film as "an affecting and admirably unsentimental portrait of lost love." Stephen Holden in The New York Times gave the film a mixed review commenting that "What began as a reasonably hardheaded look at profound and rapid cultural change turns into a feel-good fantasy of salvation."

See also
 List of lesbian, gay, bisexual or transgender-related films

References

External links 
 

2012 LGBT-related films
2012 romantic drama films
2012 films
2010s Hebrew-language films
Israeli LGBT-related films
Films about LGBT and Judaism
LGBT-related romantic drama films
Israeli drama films
Films directed by Eytan Fox